A volcano observatory is an institution that conducts research and monitoring of a volcano.

Each observatory provides continuous and periodic monitoring of the seismicity, other geophysical changes, ground movements, volcanic gas chemistry, and hydrologic conditions and activity between and during eruptions. They also provide a detailed record of eruptions in progress.

Monitor

These observations serve to characterize eruptive behavior, identify the nature of precursory activity leading to eruption, define the processes by which different types of deposits are emplaced, and specify the hazards that could be unleashed by each kind of eruption. From direct observation of precursory signs, it is possible to anticipate eruptions. In times of volcanic unrest, observatories issue warnings and recommendations - they take on an advisory role for decision-making governmental civil defense agencies (the Federal Emergency Management Agency in the U.S. or the Protezione Civile in Italy) and ideally continue producing observational data.

Research
Underlying all observatory operations is an ongoing program of fundamental research in volcanic processes, supplemented by collaborative studies with universities, government agencies (in the U.S. for instance with other US Geological Survey centers, and NOAA), industry and non-governmental organizations. Such research typically includes direct interpretation of the monitoring and eruption data, and it leads to formulation of conceptual models that can be tested by theoretical or laboratory simulations of volcanic systems.

Almost all observatories are members of the World Organization of Volcano Observatories (WOVO). The oldest volcano observatory is the Osservatorio Vesuviano (founded 1841) in Naples, now a member of the Italian government agency INGV.

See also
Alaska Volcano Observatory
California Volcano Observatory
Cascades Volcano Observatory
Hawaiian Volcano Observatory
Kamchatka Volcanic Eruption Response Team
Montserrat Volcano Observatory
Philippine Institute of Volcanology and Seismology
Piton de la Fournaise Volcano Observatory
Southern Andean Volcano Observatory
Vesuvius Observatory
Volcanic Ash Advisory Center
Volcano warning schemes of the United States
Yellowstone Volcano Observatory

References

Thompson, Dick (2002) Volcano Cowboys: The Rocky Evolution of a Dangerous Science Macmillan  pp 53–59, 142, 175
James Monroe, Reed Wicander, Richard Hazlett (2006) Physical Geology: Exploring the Earth Cengage Learning  pg 167
Rob Young, Lisa Norby (2009) Geological Monitoring pg 273

External links
 USGS: Volcano observatories website
 WOVO: World Organization of Volcano Observatories website
 WOVO: directory of volcano observatories
 Istituto Nazionale di Geofisica e Vulcanologia
 Osservatorio Vesuviano - Campania, Italy
 Sezione di Catania (Mt. Etna) 
 Observatorio Volcanológico De los Andes del Sur

 
Volcano monitoring